The Crystal Mile is a Moonee Valley Racing Club Group 2 Thoroughbred horse race held under Weight for Age conditions for horses aged three years old and upwards, over a distance of 1600 metres held at Moonee Valley Racecourse, Melbourne, Australia in late October on W. S. Cox Plate Day. Prize money is A$300,000.

History

Distance
1982 - 1600 metres

Grade
1982–1985 - Listed race
1986–1996 - Group 3
1997 onwards  -  Group 2

In 2012 the race conditions changed from handicap to Weight for Age.

Name
 1982–2006 - Waterford Crystal Mile
 2007–2011 - Jayco Crystal Mile
 2012 onwards - Schweppes Crystal Mile

Winners

 2021 - Just Folk
 2020 - Homesman
 2019 - Chief Ironside
 2018 - Cliff's Edge
 2017 - Lucky Hussler
 2016 - The United States
 2015 - Turn Me Loose
2014 - Hooked
2013 - Toydini
2012 - Silent Achiever
2011 - Testa My Patience
2010 - Sound Journey
2009 - Rangirangdoo
2008 - Sea Battle
2007 - Sonic Quest
2006 - Flash Trick
2005 - Niconero
2004 - Lad Of The Manor
2003 - Rosina Lad
2002 - Royal Code
2001 - Weasel Will
2000 - Weasel Will
1999 - Le Zagaletta
1998 - Rustic Dream
1997 - Holy Roller
1996 - Lochrae
1995 - Juggler
1994 - State Taj
1993 - Carson's Cash
1992 - Solvit
1991 - Fire Commander
1990 - Ark Regal
1989 - Fendalton
1988 - True Dreams
1987 - Tierra Rist
 1986 - Splendid Speed
 1985 - Dazzling Duke
 1984 - Keepers
 1983 - Dynamo
 1982 - Getting Closer

See also
 List of Australian Group races
 Group races

References

Horse races in Australia
Open mile category horse races